Columbia Township is a township in Wapello County, Iowa, USA.

History
Columbia Township was organized in 1844.

References

Townships in Wapello County, Iowa
Townships in Iowa